The 2021 March 4 Justice (also styled Women's March 4 Justice) took place on 15 March 2021 across Australia. The protest included a series of events in major Australian cities including the nation's capital Canberra. Protests occurred in 40 cities in Australia; organisers estimated 110,000 people were in attendance, including the federal opposition leader as well as other politicians from the major political parties.

Background 

The protests were made organised following the perceived lack of response by the Australian federal government to the reporting that a political staffer, Brittany Higgins, was allegedly raped in Australia's parliament house in Canberra, and that historical allegations of rape were made against the country's Attorney General, Christian Porter during his youth.

The protest organisers also stated that an important factor inspiring the event was the public disclosures and testimonies of harassment and assault from former schoolgirls that were collected by activist Chanel Contos who had been campaigning for schools to improve their instruction concerning sexual consent.

Protests 
The protest was initially organised by Janine Hendry, an academic, designer and entrepreneur based in Canberra. Ahead of the 15 March event, Hendry sought to lobby government minister Michael McCormack to respond to the upcoming event under the rubric of the Australian Human Rights Commission's report on sex discrimination. The report was the product of a 18-month national inquiry by the commission, and it examined the issue of sexual harassment in Australian workplaces. McCormack offered no specific assurances that the government would pursue the issue.

Protest events were organised in over 40 locations in Australia, including major cities as well as country towns. The events were endorsed by the Australian Council of Trade Unions.

Demands 
The protest organisers listed four objectives for the protest events, described in their petition to the Australian government:
 Full independent investigations into all cases of gendered violence and timely referrals to appropriate authorities. Full public accountability for findings.
 Fully implement the 55 recommendations in the Australian Human Rights Commission’s Respect@Work report of the National Inquiry into Sexual Harassment in Australian Workplaces 2020.
 Lift public funding for gendered violence prevention to world’s best practice.
 The enactment of a federal Gender Equality Act to promote gender equality. It should include a gender equity audit of Parliamentary practices.
- Women's March 4 Justice

Protests took place in over 40 cities in Australia including all state and territory capitals.

Government response 
Australian Prime Minister Scott Morrison offered to meet with the protest organisers in a private meeting. The offer was refused on the grounds that the Prime Minister should be addressing the matter publicly.

Subsequently, while in the Australian Parliament, Morrison attempted to describe the protests in a favourable light, emphasising the democratic nature of Australia that allows such protests to take place without persecution: Morrison referenced unnamed countries in the region that would have met protesters with violence, saying that "elsewhere, protesters are being met with bullets". These comments were received negatively by members of the opposition.

Teal bath
The success of the Teal independents in the 2022 Australian federal election is credited to be due to the women who protested in the March 4 Justice "getting organised".

See also 
 Me Too movement

References 

Protests in Australia
Women in Australia
2021 protests
Rape in Australia
Women's protests
Women's rights in Australia